Marie Masters (born February 4, 1941) is an American actress.

Early years
Born Marie Mastruserio in Cincinnati, Ohio, Masters attended Marian College in Indiana. After graduation, she worked at the city desk of the publication Women's Wear Daily.

Acting career

As the World Turns
Although she has played roles on Love of Life and One Life to Live, her most famous role has been Dr. Susan Stewart on As the World Turns, a role she played from 1968 to 1979 and from 1986 to 2010. The character of Susan was an alcoholic "homewrecker" during the show's heyday in the 1970s. The character again was featured as the troublemaker in 1990 when the show featured a storyline with Susan having an affair with the show's cornerstone male character, Dr. Bob Hughes. The storyline was unusual in that all of the actors were over 50, yet the affair became a popular, attention-grabbing storyline for nearly a year. Masters was reduced to recurring basis in 2002 but was still seen often during ATWT's final years. She was prominently featured in the 50th anniversary episode of the show in April 2006 and participated in the final episode in September 2010.

Other roles
Masters has been featured on several primetime programs, including Kate and Allie, Law & Order, and Our Group. Masters has been involved with the New York City theater group New Group since its inception in 1993, and has been a director or assistant director for many productions. In 1982, she played District Attorney Helen Murdoch on "One Life to Live", prosecuting Victoria Riley for refusing to reveal a source.

She is also an accomplished writer, having co-written the films Mad Money, "The Special", "Played Out" and "Loveland". For several years, Masters was a member of the writing team at As the World Turns.

Personal life
Masters is the mother of Grammy award-winning musician Jesse Harris and Jenny Harris, an executive producer of Lou Dobbs Tonight. Masters' son-in-law is CNBC market analyst David Faber.

References

External links

 

1941 births
American soap opera actresses
American soap opera writers
Living people
21st-century American women